Gari David Clifford is a British-American physicist, biomedical engineer, academic, and researcher. He is the Chair of Emory's Department of Biomedical Informatics and a Professor of Biomedical Engineering and Biomedical Informatics at Emory University and Georgia Institute of Technology.

Clifford has authored over 400 publications, and has multiple patents awarded. His research is focused on scalable and affordable healthcare, and his major application areas include, Cardiovascular Disease, Circadian Rhythms and Sleep, Maternal/Fetal Health and Neuropsychiatric Diseases.

Clifford is the Director of the PhysioNet/Computing in Cardiology Challenges, the co-founder and CTO of MindChild Medical Inc., and the co-founder of LifeBell AI, where he serves as a Chief Scientific Officer. He is the Deputy Editor of IOP Journal of Physiological Measurement, and has served as an International Advisory Board Member of the Research Resource for Complex Physiologic Signals (otherwise known as ‘PhysioNet’).

Education
Clifford studied at the University of Exeter and received his bachelor's degree in Physics and Electronics in 1992. He then earned a master's degree in Theoretical Physics from the University of Southampton in 1995, and his Doctoral degree in Biomedical Engineering from the University of Oxford in 2003.

Career
Following his Doctoral degree, he joined Massachusetts Institute of Technology as a Postdoctoral Fellow in 2003, then Research Scientist in 2004, and Principal Research Scientist from 2005 to 2009. From 2009 to 2014, he was appointed as an Associate Professor of Biomedical Engineering at the University of Oxford, and subsequently as a Visiting Professor from 2014 to 2017. He held concurrent appointments as Associate Professor of Biomedical Informatics at Emory University, and as Associate Professor of Biomedical Engineering at Georgia Institute of Technology from 2014 till 2019. He currently serves as Professor of Biomedical Informatics and Biomedical Engineering at Emory University and Georgia Institute of Technology.

At Emory University, he was appointed as Interim Chair in 2016 and then as Chair of the Department of Biomedical Informatics since 2019.

Research
Clifford's research focuses on four main themes.

Healthcare Technology in Low-resource Settings
Clifford has worked on scalable and affordable healthcare in low-resource settings. Most notably, he and his research team developed a novel method of identifying intrauterine growth restriction and gestational age estimation from a low-cost Doppler. In collaboration with Rachel Hall-Clifford, and the Maya Health Alliance, the team have developed a co-design program to deploy this AI-driven mHealth technology to improve outcomes in pregnancy and early childhood in Guatemala. While on faculty at the University of Oxford he founded the Oxford Centre for Affordable Healthcare, in which he along with his research team and collaborators developed a $5 mHealth blood pressure device, a mobile stethoscope used in South Africa, a cardiovascular disease screening system used in a clinical trial in India, and a smart hand-pump system for East Africa.

The PhysioNet/Computing in Cardiology Challenges
Clifford is most well known for his contributions to the NIH-funded Research Resource for Complex Physiological Signals (known as PhysioNet) and his leadership of the associated PhysioNet Challenges, a series of annual international competition which has run for over two decades. Clifford managed the coordination, assembly and dissemination of the MIMIC II database (through PhysioNet).

Computational ECG Analysis
During his doctoral work at the University of Oxford, Clifford along with co-author Patrick McSharry, introduced a dynamical model which is based on three coupled ordinary differential equations, and is capable of generating realistic synthetic electrocardiogram (ECG) signals. Later, while at MIT, Clifford collaborated with Christian Jutten and Reza Sameni to develop a novel approach to recording and extracting fetal ECG. This work was licensed and spun out into a startup, Mindchild Medical Inc. He subsequently demonstrated that the approach could accurately extract important clinical parameters (QT intervals and ST-levels).

Digital Mental Health and Computational Neuro-psychiatry
While on faculty at the University of Oxford, Clifford established a program in Computational Neuro-psychiatry, funded by the UK's Engineering and Physical Sciences Research Council, and the Wellcome Trust, to use passive data collected from mobile phones, and active data from body worn sensors to assess mental health status in schizophrenic and bipolar disorder patients. Later, he extended this program to use passive eye-tracking and emotion analysis from video to evaluate depression, mild cognitive impairment, and Post-Traumatic Stress Disorder.

Awards and honors
2009 - Martin Black Award, Institute of Physics 
2010 - Mobile Health Industry Summit Challenge winner; ‘best R&D project’ (mStethoscope)
2010 - mHealth Alliance Award and Vodafone Wireless Challenge (for SanaMobile)
2011 - 1st Prize, International Engineering World Health Design Competition
2012 - ‘Best Innovation Leveraging Technology’, Dell Social Innovation Challenge
2014 - 1st Prize, PhysioNet / Computing in Cardiology Challenge (Phase III)
2015 - Distinguished Guest Professor, Tsinghua University, Beijing
2017 - Elected to the Fulbright Specialist Roster
2019 - Outstanding Achievement in Research Program Development, Georgia Institute of Technology
2020 - Max Harry Weil Memorial Award, The Society for Critical Care Med
2023 - Fellowship of the IEEE "for contributions to machine-learning applications in cardiovascular time series"

Bibliography
McSharry, P. E., Clifford, G. D., Tarassenko, L., & Smith, L. A. (2003). A dynamical model for generating synthetic electrocardiogram signals. IEEE transactions on biomedical engineering, 50(3), 289–294.
Clifford, G. D., Azuaje, F., & McSharry, P. (2006). Advanced methods and tools for ECG data analysis (p. 12). Boston: Artech house.
Saeed, M., Villarroel, M., Reisner, A. T., Clifford, G., Lehman, L. W., Moody, G., ... & Mark, R. G. (2011). Multiparameter Intelligent Monitoring in Intensive Care II (MIMIC-II): a public-access intensive care unit database. Critical care medicine, 39(5), 952.
Sameni, R., Shamsollahi, M. B., Jutten, C., & Clifford, G. D. (2007). A nonlinear Bayesian filtering framework for ECG denoising. IEEE Transactions on Biomedical Engineering, 54(12), 2172–2185.
Sameni, R., & Clifford, G. D. (2010). A review of fetal ECG signal processing; issues and promising directions. The open pacing, electrophysiology & therapy journal, 3, 4.

References 

American people of British descent
American physicists
Alumni of the University of Southampton
Alumni of the University of Oxford
Emory University faculty
Georgia Tech faculty
Living people
Year of birth missing (living people)